Stevan Nešticki Tournament is a football tournament for players U-17 or U-18. It is traditionally organised by FK Vojvodina at the football pitch of Vujadin Boškov Sports Centre in Novi Sad, Serbia. It is a memorial event in honor of tragically deceased FK Vojvodina`s player Stevan Nešticki. This is one of the stronger competitions in southeast Europe in these categories.

History

References

Football competitions in Serbia
FK Vojvodina